The Petronia cabinet was the 6th cabinet of the Netherlands Antilles.

Composition
The cabinet was composed as follows:

|Minister of General Affairs
|Ernesto Petronia
|PPA
|12 December 1969
|-
|Minister of Finance
|Sylvius Gerard Marie Rozendal
|DP
|12 December 1969
|-
|Minister of Education
|Otto R.A. Beaujon
|DP
|12 December 1969
|-
|Minister of Traffic and Communications
|Leo A.I. Chance
|PPA
|12 December 1969
|-
|Minister of Economic Affairs
|Frank J. Pijpers
|DP
|12 December 1969
|-
|rowspan="2"|Minister of Welfare
|Frank J. Pijpers
|DP
|12 December 1969
|-
|Francisco Jose Tromp
|PPA
|16 July 1970
|-
|rowspan="3"|Minister of Social Affairs
|Amador Poulo Nita 
|FOL
|12 December 1969
|-
|Ernesto Petronia
|PPA
|24 June 1970
|-
|Rufus F. McWilliam
|PNP
|16 July 1970
|-
|rowspan="3"|Minister of Justice
|Ernesto Petronia
|PPA
|12 December 1969
|-
|Francisco Jose Tromp
|PPA
|18 April 1970
|-
|Ernesto Petronia
|PPA
|16 July 1970
|-
|rowspan="3"|Minister of Public Health 
|Amador Poulo Nita 
|FOL
|12 December 1969
|-
|Ernesto Petronia
|PPA
|24 June 1970
|-
|Lucinda da Costa Gomez-Matheeuws
|PNP
|16 July 1970
|-
|Minister of Labor
|Hilberto M. Thomas
|FOL
|5 September 1970
|}

 Nita died unexpectedly on 17 June 1970.

References

Cabinets of the Netherlands Antilles
1969 establishments in the Netherlands Antilles
Cabinets established in 1969
Cabinets disestablished in 1971
1971 disestablishments in the Netherlands Antilles